Makula is a surname. Notable people with the surname include:

Edward Makula (1930–1996), Polish aviator
Jerzy Makula (born 1952), Polish aviator
Joseph Makula (born 1929), Democratic Republic of the Congo photographer
Stanisław Makula, Polish aviator
 Mantombizana Makula.

See also
Makula family